Jamal Bevon Gay (born 9 February 1989) is a Trinidadian former professional footballer who played as a forward. He played abroad with 2. Bundesliga club Rot-Weiß Oberhausen and Veikkausliiga side RoPS. He scored 7 goals from 21 appearances for the Trinidad & Tobago national team. He was a member of Trinidad & Tobago under 23 Olympic team that almost qualified for London games 2012. He was top scorer with 6 goals in 11 matches. He also played for the Trinidad & Tobago U20 at the 2009 FIFA U-20 World Cup..

Early life 
Gay was born and raised in the South Arima neighborhood of La Horquetta

Club career 
Gay began his career 2003 with Joe Public and moved after one year to El Dorado Secondary Comprehensive but returned in 2008 to Joe Public. On 29 January 2009, he moved  to Rot-Weiß Oberhausen and signed a contract until 30 June 2011, after being successfully on trial at Oberhausen since 13 January 2009. He played his first game for Rot-Weiß Oberhausen on 8 February 2009 against FC Ingolstadt 04 in the 2. Bundesliga. On 31 January 2010, he was released from contract by Rot-Weiß Oberhausen. Gay joined Caledonia AIA in July 2011.

International career 
Gay was called up on 18 February 2008 for the game against El Salvador, he played his first game here on 19 March 2008 against El Salvador, formerly presented the Under-20 team. His first goal was on 11 May 2008 against Barbados. He represented his country at 2009 FIFA U-20 World Cup in Egypt. Gay scored his second international goal in his fifth cap as Trinidad and Tobago put three past St Lucia. He scored four goals in one game vs Anguilla in the Caribbean cup.

Career statistics
Scores and results list Trinidad and Tobago's goal tally first, score column indicates score after each Gay goal.

References

External links
 
 Jamal "Yaya" Gay new role winning pundits.
 Jamal joins RoPS on one year deal
 A striker on a mission – Meet Jamal Gay
 Launch Jamal Gay Profile
 
 Soca Warriors Profile 

1989 births
Living people
People from Arima
Trinidad and Tobago footballers
Association football forwards
Trinidad and Tobago international footballers
TT Pro League players
2. Bundesliga players
Veikkausliiga players
Joe Public F.C. players
Rot-Weiß Oberhausen players
Morvant Caledonia United players
Rovaniemen Palloseura players
Club Sando F.C. players
Central F.C. players
Footballers at the 2011 Pan American Games
2013 CONCACAF Gold Cup players
2014 Caribbean Cup players
Pan American Games competitors for Trinidad and Tobago
Trinidad and Tobago expatriate footballers
Trinidad and Tobago expatriate sportspeople in Germany
Expatriate footballers in Germany
Trinidad and Tobago expatriate sportspeople in Finland
Expatriate footballers in Finland